Horst Bienek (May 7, 1930 in Gleiwitz – December 7, 1990 in Munich) was a German novelist and poet.

Life 
Born in Gleiwitz, Upper Silesia, Germany (today Gliwice, Poland), Bienek was forced to leave there in 1945, when Germans were expelled from Silesia. He resettled in the eastern part of Germany. For a time, he was a student of Bertolt Brecht. In 1951, he was arrested by NKVD and sentenced in a show trial to 25 years of labour for "anti-Soviet incitement" and alleged espionage on behalf of the United States, and sent to a Gulag concentration camp in Vorkuta. When he was released as the result of an amnesty in 1955, he settled in West Germany. Much of his writing addressed the theme of his uprooting from his Upper Silesian homeland 

Although he was homosexual, his autobiographical writings  never discussed openly his own homosexuality, and his novels only on occasion allude gently to homosexual attraction.

Bienek died in Munich in 1990 from AIDS.

Work 
Bienek was the winner of numerous prizes, including the Nelly Sachs Prize in 1981. His best-known work is the four-volume series of novels dealing with the prelude to World War II and the war itself, Gleiwitz, Eine oberschlesische Chronik in vier Romanen.

Three of his works were adapted for film:

 Die Zelle (1970)  
 Die erste Polka (1979)  
 Schloß Königswald (1987).

Four of Bienek's novels have been translated into English:

 The First Polka (1978)
 September Light (1986)
 The Cell (1973)
 Time Without Bells (1988)

See also
 Horst-Bienek-Preis für Lyrik, a literary prize named after Bienek

References

20th-century German novelists
20th-century German poets
People from the Province of Upper Silesia
People from Gliwice
AIDS-related deaths in Germany
1930 births
1990 deaths
German male poets
German male novelists
German-language poets
Silesian-German people
German gay writers
German LGBT poets
German LGBT novelists
20th-century German male writers
Officers Crosses of the Order of Merit of the Federal Republic of Germany
20th-century German LGBT people
Participants in the Vorkuta uprising